Maria Carrillo High School is a public high school in Santa Rosa, California, United States. It is managed by the Santa Rosa City Schools district. It opened in 1996 and is in Santa Rosa's Rincon Valley neighborhood.

History 

Maria Carrillo High School opened in 1997 and is named after María Ygnacia López de Carrillo.

In 2011, a YouTube video of Maria Carrillo student Kayla Kearney speaking at a Martin Luther King Jr. memorial assembly went viral after Kearney came out during her speech.

Maria Carrillo High School (MCHS), a California Distinguished High School 2013, is one of five comprehensive high schools in the Santa Rosa City Schools district. MCHS currently enrolls 1,550 students in grades 9-12. The school received its first regular accreditation by the Western Association of Schools and Colleges in 1999.

Curriculum 

Maria Carrillo follows curriculum as mandated by the Santa Rosa City Schools district. The school offers English classes, fine arts, mathematics, physical education, social sciences, and science classes. The latter include biology, chemistry, zoology, physics, and physical science.
The school has a culinary program, in which students learn cooking skills and compete for awards at local Santa Rosa restaurants.

Extracurricular activities

Sports
	
The school has a girls and boys basketball team. In November, 2011, the girls basketball coach resigned after being accused of bullying team members over the course of his career at the school. There is a track and field team, which is part of the North Coast Section competition field. There is also a baseball team, which, as of 2004, were the two-time North Coast Section champions.

Notable alumni

Madeline Jane "Maya" DiRado, Class of 2010, is an American former competitive swimmer who specialized in freestyle, butterfly, backstroke, and individual medley events. She won four medals in the 2016 Summer Olympics- two gold, one silver, and one bronze.

Kevin Jorgeson, Class of 2003, is an American mountain climber; he partnered with Tommy Caldwell to successfully free climb The Dawn Wall of El Capitan in Yosemite National Park.

Tristan Harris, Class of 2002, is the founder of the Center for Humane Technology, an organization focused on better aligning technology with the needs of humanity. Harris was featured on TED Talks and 60 Minutes.

Andrew Vaughn, Class of 2016, baseball player, winner of the 2018 Golden Spikes Award with the University of California, drafted third overall by the Chicago White Sox in the 2019 Major League Baseball Draft.

Maria Carrillo High School Alumni Hall of Fame.

References

External links 
 

High schools in Santa Rosa, California
High schools in Sonoma County, California
Public high schools in California
1996 establishments in California